Choman is a city in Erbil Governorate of Kurdistan region in Iraq.It is the district capital of the Choman District. 

The city of Choman is inhabited by Kurds.

References

External links 
 Panoramio: Choman photo

Cities in Iraqi Kurdistan
District capitals of Iraq
Populated places in Erbil Governorate
Kurdish settlements in Erbil Governorate